γ-Carotene (gamma-carotene) is a carotenoid, and is a biosynthetic intermediate for cyclized carotenoid  synthesis in plants. It is formed from cyclization of lycopene by lycopene cyclase epsilon.  Along with several other carotenoids, γ-Carotene is a vitamer of vitamin A in herbivores and omnivores. Carotenoids with a cyclized, beta-ionone ring can be converted to vitamin A, also known as retinol, by the enzyme Beta-carotene 15,15'-dioxygenase; however, the bioconversion of gamma-carotene to retinol has not been well-characterized.

References

Carotenoids
Cyclohexenes